Mishaal  is a Pakistani television play/drama. It was aired by PTV in 2009. It has 17 episodes. It was written, produced and directed by Abdul Rauf Khalid.

Plot 
Mishaal is an Urdu language TV drama. It is a crime thriller drama with a love story at the backdrop. Mishaal lives with her brother, elder sister and her paternal uncle who is very strict. This makes her brother rebellious and he ends up running away from home into the wrong hands. Will their family get their happy ending?

Cast 
 Bilal Qureshi
 Anum Zahra (Strawbarro) as Mishaal
 Babar Ali as Rashid: Mishaal's elder brother
 Sana Zahra (Fruito) as Asifa
 Sunny Baba
 Waqas Majeed Khan
 Rashid Mehmood as Mishaal's father
 Ghulam Mohiyuddin as Mansoor Ali Khan
 Saba Qamar as Hiba
 Juggan Kazim as Dua
 Kinza Malik as Saifunnisa: Mishaal's elder sister
 Qavi Khan as Alam

References

External links 
 Watch PTV drama serial 'Mishaal' (2009) on YouTube, retrieved December 26, 2016

Pakistani drama television series
Urdu-language television shows
Pakistan Television Corporation original programming
2009 Pakistani television series debuts
2009 Pakistani television series endings